The Patalkot Express is an Express train which runs between Chhindwara Junction railway station in the city of Chhindwara in Madhya Pradesh and Firozpur the city of Punjab.  The name "Patalkot" signifies the nearest tourist spot of Patalkot.

Arrival and departure
Patalkot express (14624/14623)/ Kanahan Valley express 11101/11102 used to run between Chhindwara and Jhansi/Gwalior are planned to be extended to Sarai Rohilla (Delhi) with new train numbers (14009, 14010, 14019, 14020) and new timetable. 
Present train bookings have been suspended from the end of August 2012. The new trains have started as of 1 January 2013, with numbers 14009 and 14010.

Routes and halts
The train goes via Parasia, Amla Junction, Itarsi Junction, Bhopal Junction and Agra Cantt.  The important halts of the train are:

Coach composition
The train consists of 18 coaches of which:
 1 AC II tier
 2 AC III tier 
 7 sleeper
 6 general
 2 brake cum luggage van

Average speed and frequency
The train runs daily with an average speed of 49 km/hour.

References
 

Transport in Chhindwara
Transport in Delhi
Named passenger trains of India
Rail transport in Madhya Pradesh
Rail transport in Delhi